Dawid Krupa (born 12 June 1980 in Rzeszów) is a Polish former cyclist.

Palmares
1999
1st stage 3 Tour of Yugoslavia
2000
1st Paris-Mantes-en-Yvelines
2005
2nd Overall Szlakiem Walk Majora Hubala
3rd Overall Tour of China
3rd Overall Okolo Slovenska
2006
3rd Overall Tour of Greece
1st Stage 3
2007
3rd Overall Tour of Małopolska
1st Stage 3

References

1980 births
Living people
Polish male cyclists
Cyclists at the 2004 Summer Olympics
Olympic cyclists of Poland
People from Rzeszów
Sportspeople from Podkarpackie Voivodeship